Chrysendeton kimballi is a moth in the family Crambidae. It was described by William Harry Lange in 1956. It is found on North America, where it has been recorded from Florida, Louisiana, Mississippi and South Carolina. March to October.

References

Acentropinae
Moths described in 1956